Kalateh-ye Qassab may refer to:
 Kalateh-ye Qassab, Khusf